Padma Shri Bhabani Charan Pattanayak (11 May 1922 – 14 May 2020) was an Indian politician and independence activist. He was a Member of the Parliament of India representing Odisha in the Rajya Sabha, the upper house of the Indian Parliament, for three terms. Pattanayak was elected in 1961, 1966 and 1978. He had earlier taken part in the Indian freedom struggle. In 2018, he was awarded the Padma Shri.

He was also one of the  founder members of Nimapara Autonomous College, Nimapara.

He died in Bhubaneswar on May 14, 2020 at the age of 98.

References

External links
Profile on Rajya Sabha website

1922 births
2020 deaths
Place of birth missing
Indian National Congress politicians
Odisha politicians
Rajya Sabha members from Odisha
Recipients of the Padma Shri in public affairs